Wakeley Alexander John Gage (born 5 May 1958) is an English former professional footballer who played as a defender. He played in the Football League for four clubs, with the majority of his appearances coming for hometown club Northampton Town.

Playing career 
Gage was playing non-league football for Desborough Town when he joined Northampton for a reported £8,000 in October 1979. He spent the next six years with the Cobblers, with his performances leading to him being voted the club's player of the season in three of his last four seasons at the County Ground.

In the summer of 1985, Gage was unable to agree a new contract with Northampton and joined fellow Division Four side Chester City under new manager Harry McNally. He made his debut in a 1–1 draw against Halifax Town on the opening day of 1985–86 and a few weeks later helped Chester to go more than 400 minutes without conceding a goal. But despite helping Chester on their way towards promotion, Gage moved to Peterborough United in November 1985.

He remained with the Posh until June 1987, when he returned to Cheshire and joined Crewe Alexandra. After more than 50 league outings for Crewe, he dropped into non-league football with Stewarts & Lloyds Corby.

At , Gage was one of the tallest Football League players during his career.

Honours 
Northampton Town
 Player of the Season: 1981–82; 1983–84; 1984–85

References 

1958 births
Living people
Footballers from Northampton
English footballers
Association football defenders
Northampton Town F.C. players
Chester City F.C. players
Peterborough United F.C. players
Crewe Alexandra F.C. players
Desborough Town F.C. players
Stewarts & Lloyds Corby A.F.C. players
English Football League players